Yas Chaman may refer to:
 Yas Chaman, Fars
 Yas Chaman, Kerman